Lophophelma vigens is a moth of the family Geometridae first described by Arthur Gardiner Butler in 1880. It is found in the Himalayas and on Peninsular Malaysia, Sumatra and Borneo. The habitat consists of lower and upper montane forests.

Adults have are rather uniform brown.

Subspecies
Lophophelma vigens vigens
Lophophelma vigens ruficoloraria (Warren, 1897)

References

Moths described in 1880
Pseudoterpnini